The San Miguel River is a river in Colombia and Ecuador. It is a sub-tributary of the Solimões River (middle course of the Amazon) via the Putumayo River.

Geography
The San Miguel River rises on the slopes of the Andes Mountains, in the extreme south of the Colombian department of Nariño, on the border between Colombia and Ecuador. It then flows east, marking the border between the two countries, before passing through Ecuador and then joining the Putumayo River, again on the border.

References

Tributaries of the Amazon River
Rivers of Colombia
Rivers of Ecuador
Border rivers
Colombia–Ecuador border
International rivers of South America
Geography of Sucumbíos Province